David Nye may refer to:

David Nye (racing driver) (born 1958), race car driver
David Nye (judge) (born 1958), United States District Judge for the United States District Court for the District of Idaho
David E. Nye, professor of American history at the University of Southern Denmark
David Evelyn Nye (1906–1986), British architect